Ylönen is a Finnish surname. Notable people with the surname include:

Antti Ylönen (born 1983), Finnish ice hockey defenceman currently playing for Kärpät of the SM-liiga
Harri Ylönen (born 1972), Finnish former footballer and manager
Jesse Ylönen (born 1999), American-born Finnish professional ice hockey right winger
Juha Ylönen (born 1972), former professional ice hockey centre
Lauri Ylönen (born 1979), the frontman of the Finnish alternative rock band, The Rasmus
Petri Ylönen (born 1962), Finnish born retired ice hockey goaltender who played in the French national ice hockey team
Rafael Ylönen (1906–1997), Finnish gymnast
Sebastian Ylönen (born 1991), French ice hockey goaltender
Sirpa Ylönen (born 1957), Finnish sport shooter
Urpo Ylönen (born 1943), goaltending coach and a retired professional ice hockey player who played in the SM-liiga
Vilho Ylönen (1918–2000), Finnish skier and sport shooter

See also
The Urpo Ylönen trophy is an ice hockey award given by the Finnish SM-liiga to the best goalie of the season

Finnish-language surnames